Kruno Ivančić (born 18 January 1994) is a Croatian football winger who mosr recently played for Hrvatski Dragovoljac.

Club career 
During the 2012–13 season, Ivančić scored eight goals out of two games with Sesvete in the Druga HNL, Croatia's second division. Then he joined Istra 1961. He made his top division debut at 20 July 2014 against Hajduk Split. The game ended with a 1–1 draw.

References

External links 

1994 births
Living people
Footballers from Zagreb
Association football wingers
Croatian footballers
Croatia youth international footballers
Croatia under-21 international footballers
NK Sesvete players
NK Istra 1961 players
NK Olimpija Ljubljana (2005) players
GNK Dinamo Zagreb II players
FK Spartaks Jūrmala players
NK Aluminij players
NK Međimurje players
NK Hrvatski Dragovoljac players
Croatian Football League players
First Football League (Croatia) players
Slovenian PrvaLiga players
Latvian Higher League players
Croatian expatriate footballers
Croatian expatriate sportspeople in Latvia
Expatriate footballers in Latvia
Croatian expatriate sportspeople in Slovenia
Expatriate footballers in Slovenia